(born October 30, 1973) is a Japanese bandoneón player. He has cooperated with Japanese violinist Taro Hakase in his own album La Trampera (2001), and with Bajofondo in their album Mar Dulce.

External links
 Official website
 Ryōta Komatsu on Sony Music Online

Tango musicians
Japanese bandoneonists
Sony Music Entertainment Japan artists
1973 births
Living people
Tango in Japan
Musicians from Tokyo